The Mediterranean house gecko (Hemidactylus turcicus) is a species of house gecko common to the Mediterranean area which has spread to many parts of the world. It is commonly referred to as the Turkish gecko as represented in its Latin name and also as the moon lizard because it emerges in the evening.

A study in Portugal found H. turcicus to be totally nocturnal, with the highest activity peak around 02:00. They are insectivorous, rarely exceeding  in length, have large, lidless eyes with elliptical pupils, and purple - or tan-colored skin with black spots, often with stripes on the tail. Their bellies or undersides are somewhat translucent. It is currently unknown what impact the geckos have on native wildlife in the regions they have been introduced to.

In many parts of the world the range of H. turcicus is increasing, and unlike many other reptiles, they appear to be highly resistant to pesticides. The increase may be explained as a consequence of having few predators in places where they have been introduced, and also of their tendency to take shelter in the cracks and unseen areas of human homes, for example inside walls. Reliance on human habitation has thus contributed to their proliferation, similar to rodents. In some Eastern Mediterranean countries such as Turkey and Cyprus it is a taboo to harm them due to their benign nature and they are often kept as house pets.

Description

Snout rounded, about as long as the distance between the eye and the ear opening, 1.25 to 1.3 the diameter of the orbit; forehead slightly concave; ear-opening oval, oblique, nearly half the diameter of the eye. Body and limbs moderate. Digits variable in length, the inner always well developed; 6 to 8 lamellae under the inner digits, 8 to 10 under the fourth finger, and 9 to 11 under the fourth toe. Head with large granules anteriorly, posteriorly with minute granules intermixed with round tubercles. Rostrum four-sided, not twice as broad as deep, with medial cleft above; nostril pierced between the rostrum, the first labial, and three nasals; 7 to 10 upper and 6 to 8 lower labials; mental large, triangular, at least twice as long as the adjacent labials, its point between two large chin-shields, which may be in contact behind it; a smaller chin shield on each side of the larger pair. Upper surface of body covered with minute granules intermixed with large tubercles, generally larger than the spaces between them, suboval, trihedral, and arranged in 14 or 16 pretty, regular longitudinal series. Abdominal scales small, smooth, roundish-hexagonal, imbricate. Males with a short angular series of 4 to 10 (exceptionally 2) preanal pores. Tail cylindrical, slightly depressed, tapering, covered above with minute scales and transverse series of large keeled tubercles, beneath with a series of large transversely dilated plates. Light brown or grayish above, spotted with darker; many of the tubercles white, lower surfaces white. They may be completely translucent except for the spotting. Some are darker. 

They often seek darkness when fleeing. They may be seen singularly or in a group ranging from 2 to 5 together.

Geographic distribution 

Native to the Mediterranean region, the "Med gecko" is one of the most successful species of geckos in the world. It has spread over much of the world and established stable populations far from its native range; it holds no threatened or endangered status. It can be found in countries with Mediterranean climates, such as Portugal , Spain, France, Italy, Greece, Israel, Albania, Malta, Bulgaria, North Macedonia, coastal Croatia (except western Istria), Bosnia and Herzegovina, the Adriatic islands, coastal Montenegro, the coastal part of Albania, Cyprus, Turkey, northern Morocco, Algeria, Tunisia,  Jordan, Syria, Libya, Egypt, Lebanon, northern Yemen (the Socotra Archipelago), Somalia, Eritrea, Kenya, southern Iran, Iraq, Oman, Qatar, Saudi Arabia, Pakistan, India, the Balearic Islands (Island Addaya Grande), the Canary Islands (introduced to Gran Canaria and Tenerife), Panama, Puerto Rico, Belize, and Cuba.

As of 2016 it was known from across the Southern United States including Arizona, California, Nevada, and New Mexico in the southwest, and Alabama, Arkansas, Florida, Georgia, Kansas, Kentucky, Louisiana, Maryland, Mississippi, Missouri, North Carolina, Oklahoma, South Carolina, Texas, and Virginia, being particularly well-established in Gulf Coast states in the east. More recently records have been published from several localities in Pennsylvania, and Tennessee. It was also reported from Indiana in 2019  but, it was unknown at that time if the individual represented an established population or not.

In Mexico, introductions are known to the states Tamaulipas, Veracruz, Tabasco, Campeche, Yucatán, Baja California, Chihuahua, Coahuila, Sonora, Durango, and Nuevo León.

Habitat 
Mediterranean house geckos inhabit a wide range of habitats. They can be found in areas near human presence such as university campuses, cemeteries, coastal regions, and shrublands. In these urban or suburban areas, they are typically seen in the cracks of old brick buildings. They can also be found in other areas like mountain cliffs and caves. Their nests can be found in trash piles, attics, or under the baseboards of buildings (Klawinski, 1992).

Behavior

Mediterranean house geckos are nocturnal (Klawinski 1992). They emit a distinctive, high-pitched call somewhat like a squeak or the chirp of a bird, possibly expressing a territorial message. Because of this aggressive behavior, juveniles avoid most interaction with adult geckos (Klawinski, 1992).
They are voracious predators on moths and small roaches, and are attracted to outdoor lights in search of these prey. They are also attracted by the call of a male decorated cricket (Gryllodes supplicans) even though the males are usually safely out of reach in a burrow, because female crickets attracted to the male's call can be intercepted and eaten.

Reproduction 
Mediterranean house geckos reach sexual maturity within four months to a year. Male house geckos produce clicking sounds to attract a mate, with the female responding in her own squeaks. They also display copulatory biting, with stronger bites resulting in higher fertilization success. Fertilization is internal. Breeding season is typically from April to August each year and eggs are laid mid-May to August in an average clutch size of two. Female house geckos experience delayed fertilization and can store sperm in a funnel shaped organ called the infundibulum for up to five months. Because of this, exact gestation time is unknown but is estimated to be around 40 days. Neither males nor females have been observed providing any parental care, with males going as far as to bite the juveniles.

Prey 
Primary prey of Mediterranean house geckos has been noted to include crickets, grasshoppers, cockroaches, spiders, beetles, moths, butterflies, ants, isopods, and snails. These geckos are visual hunters; prey selection depends on whether it is alive or dead. A study by Barbour and Rose found that Mediterranean house geckos are more likely to choose living prey over dead.

Gallery

See also
 List of reptiles of Italy

Notes

References
 Franklin, Carl J. 1997 Geographic Distribution. Hemidactylus turcicus. Herpetological Review 28 (2): 96
 Burke, Russell L. 1996 Geographic Distribution. Hemidactylus turcicus. Herpetological Review 27 (1): 32
 Davis, W.K. 1974 The Mediterranean gecko, Hemidactylus turcicus in Texas J. Herpetol. 8(1): 77–80.
 Dowling, Richard G. 1996 The Mediterranean Gecko, Hemidactylus turcicus, in Prattville, Alabama Bulletin of the Chicago Herpetological Society 21 (11): 203
 Dundee, H. A. 1984 Hemidactylus turcicus (Mediterranean gecko) Herp Review 15 (1): 20
 Frick, Michael G. 1997 Geographic Distribution. Hemidactylus turcicus Herpetological Review 28 (1): 50
 Husak, Jerry F. 1996 Geographic Distribution. Hemidactylus turcicus Herpetological Review 27 (4): 211
 Jensen, Steve L.;George, Steven G. 1993 Hemidactylus turcicus (Mediterranean gecko). USA: Louisiana Herpetological Review 24 (4): 154
 Knight, C. Michael 1993 A northern range extension of Hemidactylus turcicus in the United States Dactylus 2 (2): 49-50
 Means, Ryan C. 1999 Geographic distribution. Hemidactylus turcicus Herpetological Review 30 (1): 52
 Proudfoot, Glenn;McCoid, Michael James 1996 Geographic Distribution. Hemidactylus turcicus Herpetological Review 27 (2): 87
 Ray, John;Cochran, Betsy 1997 Geographic Distribution. Hemidactylus turcicus Herpetological Review 28 (3): 157
 Williams, Avery A. 1997 Geographic Distribution. Hemidactylus turcicus Herpetological Review 28 (2): 96
 Klawinski, P. (1992). Home range, activity, and spatial distribution of the Mediterranean gecko, Hemidactylus turcicus (Master's Thesis). Nacogdoches, Texas: Stephen F. Austin State University.

External links

 
 Institut für Biowissenschaften: H. turcicus image
 Species Profile: Mediterranean Gecko by the Savannah River Ecology Laboratory
 Nonnatives: Mediterranean Gecko by the Florida Fish and Wildlife Conservation Commission

Hemidactylus
Geckos of Africa
Lizards of Asia
Lizards of Europe
Reptiles of Pakistan
Reptiles described in 1758
Taxa named by Carl Linnaeus
Reptiles of the Canary Islands